Smash Tennis is a 1993 tennis video game developed and published by Namco for the Super Nintendo Entertainment System. It is a follow-up to Family Tennis, originally published in 1987 for the Family Computer. It was designed by Hideo Yoshizawa, a former employee of Tecmo that later created Klonoa: Door to Phantomile, Mr. Driller and R4: Ridge Racer Type 4.

Gameplay
Smash Tennis is a tennis video game. Up to four players can be on the game. They must hit the ball with the SNES's controller; failing to do so will resulting in the announcer saying "fault!". After the maximum score is achieved, the court changes.

The Japanese version featured a hidden mode named "NAMCOT Theater", which is a story mode that was absent from the western release.

Development and release
Super Family Tennis was released for the Super Nintendo Entertainment System in Japan on June 25, 1993. It was released in Europe later that year for the Super Nintendo Entertainment System, published by British developer Virgin Interactive and renamed to Smash Tennis. The game was designed by Hideo Yoshizawa, a former employee of Tecmo who is best known for creating Klonoa: Door to Phantomile, Mr. Driller, and R4: Ridge Racer Type 4; Super Family Tennis was the first game for Namco he worked on. Development of the game was done by Namcot, the former home console division of Namco that was later abolished in 1995. It is the sequel to Family Tennis, which was originally released in 1987 for the Family Computer in Japan. It was digitally re-released in Japan for the Nintendo Switch on September 6, 2019 and in the rest of the world on February 19, 2020 as one of twenty SNES titles announced for the Nintendo Switch Online subscription service, making it the first time the game was released in the Americas.

Reception
The game has received mostly positive reviews. Famitsu gave the game a score of 29/40, whereas Next Generation rated it a 7/10, and Mega Fun's score is of 86/100.

In 1995, Total! ranked Smash Tennis 19th on their "Top 100 SNES Games"  and commented that compared to its predecessor that the game worked slightly better all round and having a interactive background.

Notes

References

1993 video games
Namco games
Nintendo Switch games
Super Nintendo Entertainment System games
Tennis video games
Video games developed in Japan